Behrooz Abdolvand (born 22 June 1956) is an Iranian economist and political scientist known for his research on global energy politics. He is the coordinator of the Caspian Region Environmental and Energy Studies Center in Berlin and associated member of the German Council on Foreign Relations. Abdolvand is also Board of Management Chairman at DF Deutsche Forfait AG and Managing Director of DESB GmbH, Berlin.

See also 
Nagorno-Karabakh conflict
Rationale for the Iraq War
Iran's nuclear program

References 

Iranian emigrants to Germany
Iranian expatriate academics
20th-century Iranian economists
Living people
1956 births
Academic staff of the Free University of Berlin
Free University of Berlin alumni
Iranian political scientists